Heathen Machine is the fifth album by British metal band Balance of Power. It was released in 2003 and is the only album of the band to feature vocalist John K.

Production and recording 

The album was produced and engineered by drummer Lionel Hicks. Like previous efforts, it was recorded at POD Studios and Summit Studios in London, England. It was mixed by Todd Fitzgerald and Hicks at Oarfin Studios in Minneapolis, US.

Art and design was done by PostScript Design.

Original track listing 
All songs written by Tony Ritchie and Pete Southern, except where noted.
 "The Rising" (Lionel Hicks) – 1:19
 "Heathen Machine" (Tony Ritchie) – 6:34
 "I Wish You Were Here" – 7:14
 "Chemical Imbalance" (Ritchie) – 5:14
 "No Place Like Home" (Ritchie) – 6:54
 "The Eyes of All the World" – 6:45
 "Just Before You Leave" (John K., Ritchie, Southern) – 6:31
 "Wake Up Call" – 8:21
 "Necessary Evil" – 7:46

Personnel

Band members 
 John K – lead vocals
 Pete Southern – guitar
 Tony Ritchie – bass
 Lionel Hicks – drums

Additional musicians 
 Leon Lawson – keyboards

Recording and producing 
 Lionel Hicks – producer, engineer, mixer
 Todd Fitzgerald – mixer
 PostScript Design – art design

References

External links 
Heathen Machine on Balance of Power's official website
Heathen Machine on Amazon
Heathen Machine on AllMusic

2003 albums
Balance of Power (band) albums